Eduard Nikolaevich Burdzhalov (Russian: Эдуард Николаевич Бурджалов) (1906–1985) was a Soviet historian.

Burdzhalov graduated from  Moscow Institute of History, Philosophy, and Literature in 1932. He then taught at various Moscow universities, including the Moscow State Pedagogical Institute. In 1957 he was dismissed as deputy editor of the journal Questions of History after he published an article about the Bolshevik's confusion following the February Revolution in 1917. However in 1959 he was appointed professor.

Publications
 Вторая русская революция: Восстание в Петрограде (1967) Translated: Raleigh, Donald J. (1987), Russia's Second Revolution: The February 1917 Uprising in Petrograd, Indiana University Press, 
 Вторая русская революция: Москва. Фронт. Периферия (1971).

References

1906 births
1985 deaths
Soviet historians